Hugh McCall Rhea (September 9, 1909 – October 18, 1973) was an American football player and track and field athlete.

A native of Arlington, Nebraska, Rhea attended Arlington High School and the University of Nebraska–Lincoln.  He played college football for the Nebraska Cornhuskers football team and was twice selected as an All-American tackle.  In 1930, he was selected as a first-team All-American by Grantland Rice for Collier's Weekly, and in 1931, he was selected as a third-team All-American by the Associated Press.

Rhea also competed in track and field for the Nebraska Cornhuskers, winning the shot put event at the 1932 NCAA Men's Track and Field Championships with an NCAA record-setting throw of 52 feet, 5¾ inches. He later played two games as a guard in professional football for the Brooklyn Dodgers during the 1933 NFL season. Rhea died in Florida in 1973 at age 64, and he was posthumously inducted into the Nebraska Football Hall of Fame in 1986.

References

1909 births
1973 deaths
American football tackles
American male shot putters
Brooklyn Dodgers (NFL) players
Nebraska Cornhuskers football players
College men's track and field athletes in the United States
People from Washington County, Nebraska
Players of American football from Nebraska